Guzmania radiata is a plant species in the genus Guzmania. This species is native to Ecuador and Colombia.

References

radiata
Flora of Ecuador
Plants described in 1949
Flora of Colombia